Nicholas Merkley (born May 23, 1997) is a Canadian professional ice hockey right winger currently playing under contract with HC Dinamo Minsk in the Kontinental Hockey League (KHL). Merkley was formerly rated as a top prospect who was widely projected to be a first round selection in the 2015 NHL Entry Draft. In the said Draft, he was selected 30th overall by the Arizona Coyotes, the final pick of the opening round.

Playing career
Merkley was selected ninth overall by the Kelowna Rockets in the 2012 WHL Bantam Draft. Following a strong first season with the Rockets, he was selected as the 2013–14 WHL Rookie of the Year and awarded the Jim Piggott Memorial Trophy, and during the 2014–15 WHL season he was rewarded for his outstanding play when he was selected to skate in the 2015 CHL/NHL Top Prospects Game and was also named to the 2014–15 WHL (West) Second All-Star Team after scoring 20 goals and 90 points in 72 games.

On September 3, 2015, Merkley agreed to a three-year entry-level contract with the Arizona Coyotes.

He made his NHL debut on December 19, 2017, against the Florida Panthers. He played 13 minutes 30 seconds of ice time in a 3–2 loss. He was sent back down to the AHL shortly after. On January 4, 2018, Merkley was selected for the 2018 AHL All-Star Classic Game in Utica, New York.

During the 2019–20 season while with the Tucson Roadrunners, Merkley was traded by the Coyotes to the New Jersey Devils in a deal involving star forward Taylor Hall on December 16, 2019. Merkley joined the Devils' AHL affiliate, the Binghamton Devils, and was instantly productive in collecting 8 goals and 19 points in 28 regular season games. He was later recalled by the New Jersey Devils, adding a goal and an assist in four games, before the regular season was abruptly ended due to the COVID-19 pandemic.

As an impending restricted free agent with the Devils and with the team unable to qualify in the return to play format, Merkley signed a one-year contract with the Finnish Liiga club Ässät on August 27, 2020, in order to stay in game shape. His contract included an NHL-out clause until commencement of the delayed 2020–21 North American season.

On July 26, 2021, Merkley was traded to the San Jose Sharks in exchange for Christián Jaroš. He signed a one-year contract three days later. He made his debut for the Sharks on October 30, 2021, in a 2–1 win over the Winnipeg Jets. Three days later, he recorded hist first point as an assist in a 5–3 victory against the Buffalo Sabres. His first goal came on November 4, 2021, in a 3–5 loss to the St. Louis Blues.

On March 21, 2022, Merkley was traded by the Sharks to the New York Rangers in exchange for Anthony Bitetto at the NHL trade deadline.

On August 1, 2022, having left the Rangers as a free agent, Merkley agreed to a one-year contract with Belarusian club, HC Dinamo Minsk of the KHL, for the 2022–23 season.

International play
Merkley helped Team Canada capture the gold medal at the 2014 Ivan Hlinka Memorial Tournament.

Career statistics

Regular season and playoffs

International

Awards and honours

References

External links

1997 births
Living people
Arizona Coyotes draft picks
Arizona Coyotes players
Ässät players
Binghamton Devils players
Canadian expatriate ice hockey players in Finland
Canadian expatriate ice hockey players in the United States
Canadian ice hockey right wingers
HC Dinamo Minsk players
Hartford Wolf Pack players
Kelowna Rockets players
New Jersey Devils players
National Hockey League first-round draft picks
San Jose Barracuda players
San Jose Sharks players
Ice hockey people from Calgary
Tucson Roadrunners players